The Ronald Reagan Boyhood Home is the house located at 816 S. Hennepin Ave., Dixon, Illinois, in which the 40th President of the United States Ronald Reagan lived as a youth beginning in 1920. The building was listed on the National Register of Historic Places in 1982. The home is open to visitors from April to October.

History

General
The Ronald Reagan Boyhood Home was constructed in Dixon, Illinois, in 1891; its design is fairly typical of American houses during the time period. The house's original owners were William C. and Susan Thompson; it was eventually sold, in 1917. The home's most significant period was between 1920 and 1923 and between 1975 and 1977 when it changed hands twice. In August 1980 a group of local residents, led by Lynn Knights of Dixon, Illinois, purchased the home. The group was then known as the Reagan Home Preservation and Restoration Committee.

National Historic Site designation
The home is open to the public and operated by the Ronald Reagan Boyhood Home Foundation. On February 6, 2002, (Public Law 107-137), the United States Secretary of the Interior was authorized to purchase the property from the foundation and establish a U.S. National Historic Site under the jurisdiction of the National Park Service (NPS). The law specifies that the site will not be designated as the Ronald Reagan Boyhood Home National Historic Site until after the Department of the Interior acquires the property.

The foundation made a point of pride in receiving no funding from the state or federal government, in keeping with Reagan's motto that "government is not the solution to our problem. Government is the problem." However, visits dwindled to 5,000 per year by 2019, and the house increasingly fell into disrepair. In 2018, the foundation's perilous finances forced it to offer to sell the home to the National Park Service, which manages 16 other presidential homes. However, in December 2020, Young America's Foundation stepped in to protect the property and preserve the ideas and principles President Reagan developed while there for future generations, just as YAF has preserved and protected Ronald Reagan’s beloved Rancho del Cielo in Santa Barbara, California.

Architecture and design
The 1891 house is cast in the popular Queen Anne style. The two-storey house rests on a stone foundation and is topped with a gable roof which was originally covered with cedar shingles.

Historic significance

National Register significance
The Reagan Boyhood Home is most significant as the home of 40th U.S. President Ronald Reagan and his family from late 1920 until 1923. Reagan was nine years old at the time and in grade school. Though the family moved from the house they remained in Dixon throughout the former president's formative years. For its association with Reagan and significance in the area of politics and government the building was listed on the National Register of Historic Places on March 26, 1982.

Reagan at the house

According to the National Register of Historic Places documentation, Ronald Reagan stated that the house was associated with important events of his childhood. However, his brother Neil was quoted as saying that the house designated the Boyhood Home is the "wrong one for Ronald's principal memories of the town (Dixon)." One author, James E. Combs, called Dixon's claim that the "Boyhood Home" is the actual boyhood home of Ronald Reagan a bit bogus considering the Reagans moved often and only lived in the house for about two years.

While they lived in the home the Reagan brothers shared a second-floor bedroom, despite the house having three bedrooms. Ronald's mother used the third as a work room. The lone outbuilding on the property was used by the brothers for such activities as raising rabbits. In the house's side yard Ronald and his brother would participate in pick-up football games.

See also
H. C. Pitney Variety Store Building
Tampico Main Street Historic District
Ronald Reagan Birthplace
Ronald Reagan Trail

References

Further reading
Misner, Marlin E. History of the Reagan Home: The Boyhood Home in Dixon, Illinois, S.N., 2005,.

External links

 Reagan Boyhood Home, official site, accessed June 26, 2012.
House Report 107-268 - Authorizing the Secretary of the Interior to Establish the Ronald Reagan Boyhood Home National Historic Site, and for Other Purposes", (includes link to full information on H.R. 400), THOMAS.gov, accessed January 23, 2009.

Dixon, Illinois
Ronald Reagan Trail
Historic house museums in Illinois
National Register of Historic Places in Lee County, Illinois
Presidential museums in Illinois
Museums in Lee County, Illinois
Presidential homes in the United States
Houses completed in 1891
Houses on the National Register of Historic Places in Illinois
Houses in Lee County, Illinois
1891 establishments in Illinois